CaptiveAire Systems is the largest privately held manufacturer of commercial kitchen ventilation systems in the US and a manufacturer of HVAC equipment. The company, founded by Robert L. Luddy in 1976, is headquartered in Raleigh, North Carolina. Since its inception, the company has expanded from fire suppression to a wide array of products including exhaust, pollution control, fire suppression and prevention, HVAC, and utility distribution. In 2018, CaptiveAire brought in over $500 million in revenue.

History
In November 1976, Luddy started Atlantic Fire Systems, which sold automatic dry chemical fire systems to restaurants and industry. Sales for the first full year in business reached $297,000. Luddy developed a relationship with James Maynard and Bill Carl, co-founders of the Golden Corral restaurant chain which started in nearby Fayetteville. In 1978, Ben Maynard, James’ father, suggested to Luddy that he open a sheet metal shop to manufacture ventilation hoods and integrate the fire system. Sales reached one million in 1979. In 1981, a separate company was formed for the ventilation business with the name “CaptiveAire". The company has continued to expand, acquiring several ventilation companies in order to expand its product line. In 2017, CaptiveAire entered the HVAC market with the release of a dedicated outdoor air system.

Company and products
CaptiveAire has over 1,300 employees in its network of over one hundred sales offices in the U.S. and Canada and six manufacturing plants located in North Carolina, Iowa, Oklahoma, California, Pennsylvania, and Florida. The company’s clients, made up of independent restaurants and national chains, include many well-recognized names in the national food industry. The company also services public and private institutions such as industrial, correctional, military, and school facilities.

CaptiveAire’s integrated ventilation packages include hoods, exhaust fans, electrical controls, direct-fired heaters, grease duct systems, fire suppression systems, grease filters, utility distribution systems, dedicated outdoor air systems, and internet based control systems.

Community and awards
 One of the top 500 fastest growing private companies in America, INC. magazine 
 Voted "Best in Class" for ventilation systems by industry dealers and consultants (eight times), Foodservice Equipment & Supplies magazine
 Voted "Best in Class Overall" for ventilation systems 2013, Foodservice Equipment & Supplies magazine]
 One of the 100 largest private companies in North Carolina, Business North Carolina magazine
 One of the top 50 fastest growing private companies in the Triangle area, Triangle Business Journal

References

External links
 Official Website

Manufacturing companies of the United States
Heating, ventilation, and air conditioning companies
Companies based in Raleigh, North Carolina
Manufacturing companies established in 1976
1976 establishments in North Carolina